Braasch is a surname. Notable people with the surname include:

Antje Braasch, middle-distance runner
Gary Braasch (1944–2016), American photographer and writer
Karsten Braasch (born 1967), German tennis player

See also 
Braasch Biotech, a company that specializes in the development of biopharmaceutical vaccine products
Brasch
Baasch